Tex Book Tenor is an album by American jazz saxophonist Booker Ervin featuring the last performances Ervin recorded as a leader in 1968 for the Blue Note label. The session was first released in 1976 as a double LP Back from the Gig combined with a 1964 session recorded under Horace Parlan's leadership (released in 1988 as Happy Frame of Mind) and finally released in 2005 on CD.

Reception
The Allmusic review by Thom Jurek awarded the album 4 stars and stated "This is a wonderful addition not only to the Blue Note catalog on CD, but to Ervin's own shelf as well, and should be picked up by anyone interested in him as a bandleader and composer".

Track listing
All compositions by Booker Ervin except as noted
 "Gichi" (Kenny Barron) - 7:27    
 "Den Tex" - 7:38    
 "In a Capricornian Way" (Woody Shaw) - 5:52  
 "Lynn's Tune" - 6:16    
 "204" - 10:21
Recorded at Rudy Van Gelder Studio, Englewood Cliffs, NJ on June 24, 1968.

Personnel
Booker Ervin - tenor saxophone 
Kenny Barron - piano 
Woody Shaw - trumpet
Jan Arnet - bass
Billy Higgins - drums

References 

Blue Note Records albums
Booker Ervin albums
Albums recorded at Van Gelder Studio
Albums produced by Francis Wolff
2005 albums